Robinson v Harman (1848) 1 Ex Rep 850 is an English contract law case, which is best known for a classic formulation by Parke B (at 855) on the purpose and measure of compensatory damages for breach of contract that,

Facts
Mr Harman wrote a letter, dated 15 April 1846, agreeing to grant Mr Robinson a lease on a house in High Street, Croydon, for 21 years, starting on 19 September at £110 a year. Then Mr Harman changed his mind and refused to complete the lease. It turned out the house was worth much more than £110 a year. Mr Harman had inherited the property from his recently deceased father. Although Mr Robinson's solicitor (whose fee was £15 12s 8d) had enquired whether the will may have vested the property in trustees, Mr Harman had said there was nothing of the sort, that it was his property out and out, and that he alone had the power of leasing. In fact trustees had got the property and Mr Harman had been entitled to only a moiety of the rent during his life. As a result of this breach of contract Mr Robinson, according to the plea,
"lost and was deprived of great gains and profits, which would otherwise have accrued to him, and paid, expended, and incurred liability to pay divers sums of money, in and about the preparation of the said agreement and lease, etc, amounting, to wit, to £20.”

Mr Harman urged that the plaintiff could not recover damages for the loss of his bargain. Lord Denman CJ heard the trial at the Surrey Spring Assizes. He found that Mr Robinson was entitled to £200 (including court expenses) to cover the loss to Mr Robinson from not getting the house. Mr Harman appealed.

Judgment
The Court of Exchequer Chamber held that where a party agrees to grant a good and valid lease, having full knowledge that he has no title, the plaintiff, in an action for the breach of such agreement, may recover, beyond his expenses, damages resulting from the loss of his bargain; and the defendant cannot, under a plea of payment of money into court, give evidence that the plaintiff was aware of the defect of title. Parke B's judgment went as follows.

Alderson B said,

Platt B added,

See also
Farley v Skinner

Notes

English remedy case law
1848 in case law
1848 in the United Kingdom
Court of Exchequer Chamber cases
1848 in British law